Neodorcadion pelleti is a species of beetle in the family Cerambycidae. It was described by Mulsant and Rey in 1863. It is known from Turkey. It contains the varietas Neodorcadion pelleti var. disjunctum.

References

Dorcadiini
Beetles described in 1863